Manithanum Marmangalum ( 'Human mysteries'}}) is an Indian Tamil-language TV series about supernatural phenomena, including ghosts, strange places and incidents, and aliens, with a scientific commentary.

It aired from 12 September 2016 to 30 November 2016 on Puthuyugam TV every Monday to Wednesday at 9:00PM IST for 36 episodes and hosted by Madhan.

References

External links
 Puthuyugam TV official website 
 Puthuyugam TV on YouTube
 Vina Vidai Vettai Facebook page

Puthuyugam TV television series
2016 Tamil-language television series debuts
Tamil-language horror fiction television series
Tamil-language talk shows
Tamil-language thriller television series
Tamil-language television shows
2016 Tamil-language television series endings